Marie Pilátová (14 May 1921 – 20 January 2015) was a Czech actress known for her role in the comedy trilogy Slunce, seno, jahody, Slunce, seno a pár facek and Slunce, seno, erotika; directed by Zdeněk Troška. The role of Konopníková in the trilogy was her only film appearance.

References 

Czech actresses
1921 births
2015 deaths
Czechoslovak actresses